The Best American Nonrequired Reading 2007 is the sixth annual volume in The Best American Nonrequired Reading anthology series. It is edited by Dave Eggers, introduced by Sufjan Stevens, and has cover art by Carson Ellis. It contains nineteen short pieces of fiction and non-fiction by various authors.

Works included

Notes

External links
 The Best American Nonrequired Reading  

2007 anthologies
Fiction anthologies
Nonrequired Reading 2007
Houghton Mifflin books